Social patriotism is an openly patriotic standpoint which combines patriotism with socialism. It was first identified at the outset of the First World War when a majority of Social Democrats opted to support the war efforts of their respective governments and abandoned socialist internationalism and worker solidarity. 

Social chauvinism can be described as aggressive or fanatical patriotism, particularly during time of war, in support of one's own nation (e.g., government, culture, etc.) versus other nation(s), displayed by those who are socialists or social democrats.  During World War I, most left-wing political parties took a social-chauvinist stand, with few exceptions.  Most Socialists gave up their anti-militarism and their belief in international unity among the working class in favour of "defense of the fatherland", and turned to social-chauvinism, most notably the German Social Democratic Party and the French Section of the Workers' International.

A break with social patriotism was called, leading to the foundation of a Third International.

Effects on industrial action
The consequence of this policy on labor relations within the combatant countries was something called Burgfriedenspolitik in Germany, a term deriving from the medieval concept of "peace (especially between feuding families) within a besieged city". Other countries had their own terms. By this means, strikes and other forms of industrial action were ended for the duration. When they re-emerged after the First World War, compounded with the example of the Bolsheviks in winning a revolution, a longing for the conditions which had transpired during the war was a major motivation for fascism.

Zimmerwald Conference, September 1915
At the International Socialist Conference at Zimmerwald, the social patriots were identified as "the openly patriotic majority of the formerly Social-Democratic leaders" in Germany. In France and Austria the majority were also so identified, while in Britain and Russia some, such as Henry Hyndman, the Fabians, the Trade-Unionists, Georgi Plekhanov, Ilya Rubanovich and the Nasha Zarya were mentioned. Following the conference, the political journal Vorbote was established with Anton Pannekoek as editor. In the introduction to the first issue, Pannekoek called for an "uncompromising struggle" against social patriots as well as open imperialists, leading to the foundation of a Third International through breaking with social patriotism.

Kienthal Conference, September 1916

Second Congress, 1920 
Following the founding of the Communist International the 21 conditions adopted at the Second Congress (1920) stipulated:
"6. Every party that wishes to belong to the Communist International is duty-bound to expose not only overt social patriotism but also the duplicity and hypocrisy of social pacifism; to explain systematically to the workers that without the revolutionary overthrow of capitalism, no international courts of arbitration, no treaties of any kind curtailing arms production, no manner of “democratic” renovation of the League of Nations will be able to prevent new imperialist wars."

Literary influence
It is this concept which lies behind the first motto of the tripartite series of George Orwell in his novel which was published in 1949, titled Nineteen Eighty-Four: War is Peace. His imaginary society keeps itself from labor-inspired protest by constantly being at war.

Critics
Two notable examples of Communists who fought against social-chauvinism in Germany during World War I were Rosa Luxemburg and Karl Liebknecht. They advocated a proletarian internationalism, believing that common social relations united workers across any national boundaries. They stressed that the only violence the proletariat should use is the violence necessary in a socialist revolution. A common slogan used against social-chauvinism is "No War but the Class War".

See also 
 Chauvinism
 Kienthal Conference
 Proletarian internationalism
 Revolutionary defeatism
 Social fascism
 Socialist patriotism
 World revolution
 Yellow socialism

References 

Political science terminology
Patriotism
Social democracy
Types of socialism